Private Francis Morrison (January 15, 1845 - April 30, 1913) was an American soldier who fought in the American Civil War. Morrison received his country's highest award for bravery during combat, the Medal of Honor. Morrison's medal was won for his actions in the Bermuda Hundred Campaign on June 17, 1864. He was honored with the award on April 4, 1898.

Morrison was born in Ohiopyle, Pennsylvania, entered service in Drakestown, Pennsylvania, and was buried in Ohiopyle.

Medal of Honor citation

See also
List of American Civil War Medal of Honor recipients: M–P

References

1845 births
1913 deaths
American Civil War recipients of the Medal of Honor
People from Fayette County, Pennsylvania
Union Army soldiers
United States Army Medal of Honor recipients